Garland Lorenzo Wilson (June 13, 1909 – May 31, 1954) was an American jazz pianist, perhaps best known for his work with Nina Mae McKinney. Wilson was a boogie-woogie and stride pianist.

Life and career
Garland Wilson was born in Martinsburg, West Virginia, United States.

Wilson attended Howard University in Washington, D.C. and, in the 1930s, worked in New York City at nightclubs in the area. In 1932, the pianist joined Nina Mae McKinney on a European tour. Wilson worked extensively in England as a member of local groups, and recorded with trumpeter Nat Gonella. In the liner notes of the CD box l'intégrale Django reinhardt - vol 2 he is quoted as being accompanist of French singer Jean Sablon, together with guitarist Django Reinhardt on two sides recorded on November 1, 1935 in Paris. In 1939, he returned to the United States, where he remained until 1951, when he moved to Paris, France. The artist remained there until he died in 1954.

Select discography

Solo
Memories of You (Okeh)
Rockin' Chair (Okeh)

With Charlie Lewis and Herman Chittison
Jazz In Paris: Harlem Piano in Montmartre (Sunny Side)

With Mae Barnes
Fun With Mae Barnes (Atlantic)

References

1909 births
1954 deaths
Stride pianists
Boogie-woogie pianists
American jazz pianists
American male pianists
People from Martinsburg, West Virginia
Howard University alumni
Jazz musicians from West Virginia
20th-century American pianists
20th-century American male musicians
American male jazz musicians